The 2019 FIFA Women's World Cup was the eighth edition of the FIFA Women's World Cup, the quadrennial international Women's association football championship contested by 24 women's national teams representing member associations of FIFA. It took place between 7 June and 7 July 2019, with 52 matches staged in nine cities in France, which was awarded the right to host the event in March 2015, the first time the country hosted the tournament. The tournament was the first Women's World Cup to use the video assistant referee (VAR) system. This was the second and last edition with 24 teams before expanding to 32 teams for the 2023 tournament in Australia and New Zealand.

The United States entered the competition as defending champions after winning the 2015 edition in Canada and successfully defended their title with a 2–0 victory over the Netherlands in the final. In doing so, they secured their record fourth title and became the second nation, after Germany, to have successfully retained the title. Unlike Germany, however, this victory held a distinction as the United States won both 2015 and 2019 tournaments under one manager, Jill Ellis. It was the first time in 81 years since Vittorio Pozzo did so for the Italian men's team at the 1934 and 1938 FIFA World Cups.

The matches were broadcast globally and attracted a combined audience of 1.12 billion people.

Host selection
On 6 March 2014, FIFA announced that bidding had begun for the 2019 FIFA Women's World Cup. Member associations interested in hosting the tournament had to submit a declaration of interest by 15 April 2014, and provide the complete set of bidding documents by 31 October 2014. As a principle, FIFA preferred the 2019 Women's World Cup and the 2018 FIFA U-20 Women's World Cup to be hosted by the same member association, but reserved the right to award the hosting of the events separately.

Initially, five countries indicated interest in hosting the events: France, England, South Korea, New Zealand and South Africa. Both England and New Zealand registered expressions of interest by the April 2014 deadline, but in June 2014 it was announced that each would no longer proceed. South Africa registered an expression of interest by the April 2014 deadline; but later decided to withdraw prior to the final October deadline. Both Japan and Sweden had also expressed interest in bidding for the 2019 tournament, but Japan chose to focus on the 2019 Rugby World Cup and the 2020 Summer Olympics, whilst Sweden decided to focus on European U-17 competitions instead. France and South Korea made official bids for hosting the tournament by submitting their documents by 31 October 2014.

On 19 March 2015, France officially won the bid to host the Women's World Cup and the U-20 Women's World Cup. The decision came after a vote by the FIFA Executive Committee. Upon the selection, France became the third European nation to host the Women's World Cup (following Sweden and Germany), and the fourth country to host both the men's and women's World Cup, having hosted the men's tournament in 1938 and 1998. By the time France hosted the women's World Cup, the country had also earlier hosted the UEFA Euro 2016, which served as a precursor for France's perpetration to host this competition.

Qualification

The slot allocation was approved by the FIFA Council on 13–14 October 2016. The slots for each confederation are unchanged from those of the previous tournament except the slot for the hosts has been moved from CONCACAF (Canada) to UEFA (France).

AFC (Asia): 5 slots
CAF (Africa): 3 slots
CONCACAF (North America, Central America and the Caribbean): 3 slots
CONMEBOL (South America): 2 slots
OFC (Oceania): 1 slot
UEFA (Europe): 8 slots
Host nation: 1 slot
CONCACAF–CONMEBOL play-off: 1 slot

Qualifying matches started on 3 April 2017 and ended on 1 December 2018.

Qualified teams
A total of 24 teams qualified for the final tournament. Each team's FIFA Rankings in March 2019 are shown in parentheses.

AFC (5)
 (6)
 (16)
 (7)
 (14)
 (34)
CAF (3)
 (46)
 (38)
 (49) (debut)

CONCACAF (3)
 (5)
 (53) (debut)
 (1)
CONMEBOL (3)
 (37)
 (10)
 (39) (debut)
OFC (1)
 (19)

UEFA (9)
 (3)
 (hosts) (4)
 (2)
 (15)
 (8)
 (12)
 (20) (debut)
 (13)
 (9)

Chile, Jamaica, Scotland and South Africa made their Women's World Cup debuts, while Italy took part in the event for the first time since 1999 and Argentina took part for the first time since 2007. Brazil, Germany, Japan, Nigeria, Norway, Sweden and the United States qualified for their eighth World Cup, continuing their streak of qualifying for every World Cup held so far.

Venues
Twelve cities were candidates. The final 9 stadiums were chosen on 14 June 2017; Stade de la Beaujoire in Nantes, Stade Marcel-Picot in Nancy, and Stade de l'Abbé-Deschamps in Auxerre were cut.

The semi-finals and final were played at Parc Olympique Lyonnais in the Lyon suburb of Décines-Charpieu, with 58,000 capacity, while the opening match was played at Parc des Princes in Paris. The 2019 tournament is the first under the 24-team format to be played without double-header fixtures.

Match officials
On 3 December 2018, FIFA announced the list of 27 referees and 48 assistant referees for the tournament. On 4 June 2019, FIFA announced that Canadian referee Carol Anne Chenard and Chinese assistant referee Cui Yongmei had pulled out for "health reasons."

On 15 March 2019, the FIFA Council approved the use of the video assistant referee (VAR) system for the first time in a FIFA Women's World Cup tournament. The technology was previously deployed at the 2018 FIFA World Cup in Russia. The fifteen male VAR officials were announced by FIFA on 2 May 2019.

On 26 June 2019, FIFA retained 11 officiating teams for the quarter-finals onwards. The referees included Edina Alves Batista, Marie-Soleil Beaudoin, Melissa Borjas, Stéphanie Frappart, Kate Jacewicz, Katalin Kulcsár, Kateryna Monzul, Anastasia Pustovoitova, Qin Liang, Claudia Umpiérrez and Lucila Venegas. On 5 July 2019, FIFA announced that French referee Stéphanie Frappart would officiate the final between the United States and the Netherlands.

Draw
The draw for the final tournament was held on 8 December 2018, 18:00 CET (UTC+1), at the La Seine Musicale on the island of Île Seguin, Boulogne-Billancourt. The 24 teams were drawn into six groups of four teams.

The 24 teams were allocated to four pots based on the FIFA Women's World Rankings released on 7 December 2018, with hosts France automatically placed in Pot 1 and position A1 in the draw. Teams from Pot 1 were drawn first and assigned to Position 1. This was followed by Pot 2, Pot 3, and finally Pot 4, with each of these teams also drawn to one of the positions 2–4 within their group. No group could contain more than one team from each confederation apart from UEFA, which have nine teams, where three groups had to contain two UEFA teams.

Squads

Each team had to provide to FIFA a preliminary squad of between 23 and 50 players by 26 April 2019, which was not to be published. From the preliminary squad, each team had to name a final squad of 23 players (three of whom must be goalkeepers) by 24 May 2019. Players in the final squad could be replaced by a player from the preliminary squad due to serious injury or illness up to 24 hours prior to kickoff of the team's first match.

Group stage

The match schedule for the tournament was released on 8 February 2018. Following the final draw, seven group stage kick-off times were adjusted by FIFA.

The top two teams of each group and the four best third-placed teams advanced to the round of 16.

All times are local, CEST (UTC+2).

Group A

Group B

Group C

Group D

Group E

Group F

Ranking of third-placed teams
The four best third-placed teams from the six groups advanced to the knockout stage along with the six group winners and six runners-up.

Knockout stage

In the knockout stage, if a match was level at the end of 90 minutes of normal playing time, extra time was played (two periods of 15 minutes each), where each team was allowed to make a fourth substitution. If the score was still level after extra time, the winners were determined by a penalty shoot-out.

Bracket

Round of 16

Quarter-finals

Semi-finals

Third place play-off

Final

Awards

The following awards were given at the conclusion of the tournament. The Golden Ball (best overall player), Golden Boot (top scorer) and Golden Glove (best goalkeeper) awards were sponsored by Adidas, while the Goal of the Tournament was sponsored by Hyundai Motor Company. FIFA.com shortlisted ten goals for users to vote on as the tournaments' best, with the poll closing on 17 July 2019.

Players who Dared to Shine
The FIFA Technical Study Group announced a list of ten key players of the tournament who "dared to shine".

Prize money
Prize money amounts were announced in October 2018.

Statistics

Goalscorers

Assists

Discipline
A player was automatically suspended for the next match for the following offences:
 Receiving a red card (red card suspensions may be extended for serious offences)
 Receiving two yellow cards in two matches; yellow cards expire after the completion of the quarter-finals (yellow card suspensions are not carried forward to any other future international matches)

The following suspensions were served during the tournament:

Branding 
The emblem and slogan were launched on 19 September 2017 at the Musée de l'Homme in Paris. The emblem mimics the shape of the World Cup trophy and features a stylised football surrounded by eight decorative shards of light, symbolising the eighth edition of the Women's World Cup. It alludes to several French cultural icons:

 the colours of the flag of France
 the blue and white stripes of the marinière, known also as the "Breton stripe"
 the fleur-de-lis

The World Cup's official English-language slogan is "Dare to Shine"; its French slogan is "Le moment de briller".

Ticketing
FIFA and the local organising committee sold tickets for the Women's World Cup beginning with a pre-sale of individual tickets in December 2018, single-city ticket packages in late 2018, and single-ticket sales for the general public beginning on 7 March 2019. The online platform, hosted by AP2S, permitted fans to print their tickets beginning on 20 May 2019, which included seating assignments that had separated ticketholders who had purchased their tickets as a group or family. FIFA responded to online complaints by referring to a warning in the online system that had reminded purchasers that its tickets would not be guaranteed in the same areas, inciting further outrage, but allowed families with underage children to have adjacent seating.

Mascot 
The official mascot, "Ettie" (stylised in lowercase as "ettie) was unveiled on 12 May 2018 at the TF1 Group headquarters, and was broadcast on LCI. She made her first public appearance in Paris in front of the iconic Eiffel Tower. FIFA describe her as "a young chicken with a passion for life and football" and state that "she comes from a long line of "feathered mascots" and is the daughter of Footix, the Official Mascot of the 1998 FIFA World Cup in France".

Broadcasting

FIFA sold the broadcasting rights for the World Cup to broadcasters through several companies. A total of 1.12 billion people globally watched the matches, and the final match attracted 82.18 million viewers, setting a new FIFA Women's World Cup record, surpassing the 2015 final. The 2019 tournament set several new viewership records for various countries.

Qualified UEFA teams for the Summer Olympics

The World Cup was used by UEFA to qualify three teams for the 2020 Summer Olympic women's football tournament in Japan, with the three European teams with the best results (considering only the round they reach) qualifying. If teams in contention for Olympic spots were eliminated in the same round, a maximum of four teams (determined by group stage results if necessary) would advance to play-offs in early 2020 to decide the remaining spot(s). However, this scenario did not happen for this tournament.

For the first time, as per the agreement between the four British football associations (England, Northern Ireland, Scotland, and Wales) for the women's team, Great Britain would attempt to qualify for the Olympics through England's performance in the World Cup (a procedure already successfully employed by Team GB in field hockey and rugby sevens), which they succeeded as England were among the three best European teams. Scotland also qualified for the World Cup but, under the agreement whereby the highest ranked home nation was nominated to compete for the purposes of Olympic qualification, their performance would not be taken into account. In effect, therefore, eight European teams competed for three qualification places during the World Cup.

The United States' win over France in the quarter-finals guaranteed that the three remaining semi-finalists, all from UEFA, qualified for the Olympics.

Controversies
The final's scheduling on 7 July led to a degree of criticism among supporters of women's football, as two continental men's tournament finals were held on the same day—the Copa América in Rio de Janeiro and the CONCACAF Gold Cup in Chicago. CONCACAF president Victor Montagliani described the scheduling as "a mistake", but claimed the error could not be reversed for logistical reasons. The lack of outdoor advertising across Paris, except for the Parc des Princes stadium and the temporary World Cup museum at Châtelet, was also criticised.

The Women's World Cup was the first major competition to use the updated Laws of the Game approved by the International Football Association Board (IFAB), which came into effect on 1 June 2019. Among the changes, the more severe punishment of goalkeeper encroachment during penalty kicks—including retakes after a video assistant referee review—gained the most attention and caused several successful saves to be disallowed in the group stage. The use of the Women's World Cup as a "guinea pig" for the new changes to the rules was also criticised by some footballers and coaches for being potentially sexist, as several concurrent men's continental competitions had not implemented them. Pierluigi Collina, head of referees for FIFA, denied the claim, stating that it had long been customary for rule changes to be introduced in June, before major tournaments. Following widespread criticism and a request from FIFA, the IFAB issued a temporary dispensation to waive the requirement to show goalkeepers a yellow card for stepping off the line during a penalty shootout during the knockout stage of the Women's World Cup.

The round of 16 fixture between England and Cameroon was marred by misbehaviour of some Cameroonian players, who refused to kick off for several minutes after the second English goal, deliberately fouled several players, and argued with the referee while huddling around her. Cameroonian defender Augustine Ejangue was also seen on camera spitting at English winger Toni Duggan after conceding an indirect free kick in the penalty area, from which England later scored. After the match, England manager Phil Neville said it "didn't feel like football" and that he was "completely and utterly ashamed of the opposition". The Confederation of African Football (CAF) condemned some of the players' actions, while also criticising the refereeing. Cameroon felt three crucial decisions were unjust, two of which involved the video assistant referee (VAR). FIFA announced that it would investigate the match.

References

External links

FIFA Women's World Cup France 2019, FIFA.com
FIFA Technical Report
FIFA Physical Analysis
Results at RSSSF

 
2019
2019 FIFA Women's World Cup
2019 in women's association football
2018–19 in French women's football
FIFA Women's World Cup
July 2019 sports events in France
Uefa